Alain Tallon (14 November 1967) is a French modernist historian, specialist of religious history.

Principal works 
 .La Compagnie du Saint-Sacrement (1629–1667). Spiritualité et société - Cerf, Paris - 1990 - .
 .La France et le concile de Trente (1518–1563) - Bibliothèque des Écoles française d’Athènes et de Rome, Rome - 1997 - .
 Le concile de Trente - Cerf, coll. « Petite histoire » - Paris - 2000 .
 Conscience nationale et sentiment religieux en France au XVIe. Essai sur la vision gallicane du monde - Presses universitaires de France, Paris - 2002 - .
 Charles Quint face aux Réformes (with Guy Le Thiec), actes du colloque international organisé par le Centre d'histoire des Réformes et du protestantisme {11e colloque Jean Boisset), Montpellier, 8–9 juin 2001, Honoré Champion, Paris - 2005 .
 Pouvoirs, contestations et comportements dans l'Europe moderne : mélanges en l'honneur du professeur Yves-Marie Bercé, dir. Bernard Barbiche, Jean-Pierre Poussou et Alain Tallon - Paris : PUPS (Presses de l'Université Paris-Sorbonne) - 2005 - .
 L'Europe de la Renaissance - Paris : Presses universitaires de France - 2006 - (Que sais-je ?, 3767) - .
 Le sentiment national dans l'Europe méridionale aux XVIe et XVIIe siècles, France, Espagne, Italie (actes du colloque international, 27 and 28 September 2004, Madrid, organisé par la Casa de Velázquez) - éd. Alain Tallon, Madrid : Casa de Velázquez - 2007 - .
 La Réforme en France et en Italie : contacts, comparaisons et contrastes (actes du colloque international de Rome, 27–29 October 2005) - éd. Philip Benedict, Silvana Seidel Menchi et Alain Tallon - Rome : École française de Rome - 2007 - .
 L' Europe au XVIe siècle. États et relations internationales - Paris : Presses universitaires de France - 2010 - (Nouvelle Clio) - .

External links 
 Alain Tallon resume on the site of the Université Paris Sorbonne
  Alain Tallon : François : le Pape fait-il vraiment la révolution ? on YouTube
 Hommage à l'historien Marc Venard. Alain Tallon on La Croix

École Normale Supérieure alumni
20th-century French historians
21st-century French historians
1967 births
Living people